Scopula epigypsa is a moth of the family Geometridae. It was described by Edward Meyrick in 1886. It is endemic to Fiji.

The larvae feed on Ficus obliqua.

References

Endemic fauna of Fiji
Moths described in 1886
epigypsa
Taxa named by Edward Meyrick
Moths of Fiji